Gregory Reid Wiseman (born November 11, 1975) is an American astronaut, engineer, and naval aviator. He served as Chief of the Astronaut Office until November 14, 2022. 

Wiseman was selected in June 2009 as a member of the NASA Astronaut Group 20 and qualified as an astronaut in 2011. Wiseman took part in his first spaceflight as part of the crew of Expedition 40/41, which launched to the International Space Station on May 28, 2014, and returned on November 10, 2014. Before joining NASA, Wiseman was a Naval Aviator and test pilot. Wiseman was the Deputy Chief of the Astronaut Office from June 2017, working under Chief Astronaut Patrick Forrester. On December 18, 2020, he was promoted to Chief of the Astronaut Office at NASA.

Personal life and education
Reid Wiseman, a native of Baltimore, Maryland, and a graduate of Dulaney High School in the suburb of Timonium, earned a degree in engineering from Rensselaer Polytechnic Institute. He subsequently obtained a master's degree in systems engineering from Baltimore's Johns Hopkins University in 2006. Wiseman is married to the former Carroll Taylor and has two daughters as of 2009.  He is also a  go-cart driver.

Navy career
Reid was commissioned through the NROTC program following graduation from Rensselaer Polytechnic Institute in 1997 and reported to Naval Air Station Pensacola, Florida for flight training.  He was designated a Naval Aviator in 1999 and reported to Fighter Squadron 101, Naval Air Station Oceana, Virginia, for transition to the F-14 Tomcat.  Following his initial training, Reid was assigned to Fighter Squadron 31, also at NAS Oceana, and made two deployments to the Middle East supporting Operations Southern Watch, Enduring Freedom, and Iraqi Freedom.

During his second deployment in 2003, he was selected to attend the U.S. Naval Test Pilot School (NTPS) at Naval Air Station Patuxent River, Maryland with NTPS Class 125.  Following graduation in June 2004, Reid was assigned as a Test Pilot and Project Officer at Air Test and Evaluation Squadron Two Three (VX-23) at NAS Patuxent River.  At VX-23, Reid earned his M.S. degree and worked various flight test programs involving the F-35C Lightning II, F/A-18 Hornet weapons separation, Ship Suitability, and the T-45 Goshawk.

Following his tour at NAS Patuxent River, Reid reported to Carrier Air Wing Seventeen (CVW-17) as the Strike Operations Officer, where he completed a deployment around South America.  From there he was assigned to Strike Fighter Squadron 103 at NAS Oceana, flying the F/A-18F Super Hornet.  He was deployed to the Middle East when he was selected for Astronaut training. While serving with various U.S. Navy units, he was awarded the Air Medal with Combat V (five awards), the Navy and Marine Corps Commendation Medal with Combat V (four awards), the Navy and Marine Corps Achievement Medal, and various other campaign and service awards.

NASA career

On June 29, 2009, the National Aeronautics and Space Administration (NASA) announced Wiseman's selection as one of nine candidates from 3,500 applicants to begin astronaut training. At the time, he was serving as a Lieutenant Commander in the U.S. Navy, flying as a pilot with Strike Fighter Squadron 103 on the aircraft carrier USS Dwight D. Eisenhower (CVN 69), and based at NAS Oceana, Virginia. Wiseman said he often went to the U.S. Navy's "Blue Angels" shows as a youth, and developed the strong desire to become an astronaut when he saw a Space Shuttle launch in person in 2001.

Expedition 40/41
Wiseman was part of the Expedition 40/41 International Space Station crew. The mission was six months in duration and lasted from May to November 2014.  Wiseman launched at 19:57 UTC on May 28, 2014.  The mission returned to Earth at 03:58 UTC on November 10, 2014.

Chief of the Astronaut Office
Wiseman was selected to be the new Chief of the Astronaut Office on December 18, 2020, replacing Patrick Forrester.  He previously served as Forrester's Deputy Chief of the Astronaut Office. He stepped down as Chief on November 14, 2022 to return to the active flight rotation.  He is rumored to be a prime candidate to be one of the four astronauts selected for the Artemis 2 mission, the first manned flight of the Orion Spacecraft.

References
{

1975 births
Living people
Aquanauts
People from Baltimore
People from Timonium, Maryland
Rensselaer Polytechnic Institute alumni
Johns Hopkins University alumni
United States Naval Test Pilot School alumni
American test pilots
United States Navy officers
United States Navy astronauts
United States Naval Aviators
Recipients of the Air Medal
Spacewalkers